The Roman Catholic Archdiocese of Beijing is a Metropolitan Latin archdiocese in the People's Republic of China.

Special churches 
Its cathedral is the Cathedral of the Immaculate Conception (South Church) located in the city of Beijing, which replaces the former cathedral, now the Holy Saviour Church (North Church), also in former Peking.

History 
 Established in 1307 as Archdiocese of Khanbaliq under John of Montecorvino by Pope Clement V. See Catholic Church in China#Yuan dynasty (1271–1368).
 Lost territory twice: in 1313 to establish the Roman Catholic Diocese of Citong 刺桐 and in 1320 to establish  the Roman Catholic Diocese of Ili-baluc.
 1375: Suppressed
 Restored on April 10, 1690 as Diocese of Beijing, on territory split off from the Apostolic Vicariate of Nanjing
 Lost territory repeatedly: on 1831.09.09 to establish the Apostolic Vicariate of Korea, in 1838 to establish the Apostolic Vicariate of Liaotung 遼東, on 1839.09.03 to establish the Apostolic Vicariate of Shantung 山東 and on 1856.04.02 to establish the Apostolic Vicariate of Southwestern Chi-Li 直隸西南
 May 30, 1856: Demoted to an exempt missionary pre-diocesan jurisdiction as Apostolic Vicariate of Northern Chi-Li
 Lost territory repeatedly again: on 1899.12.23 to establish the Apostolic Vicariate of Eastern Chi-Li 直隸東境, on 1910.02.14 to establish the Apostolic Vicariate of Central Chi-Li 直隸中境 and on 1912.04.27 to establish the Apostolic Vicariate of Coastal Chi-Li 直隸海濱
 December 3, 1924: Renamed as Apostolic Vicariate of Beijing
 Lost territory on 1926.05.10: to establish the Apostolic Vicariate of Xuanhuafu 宣化府 and 1929.05.25 to establish the Mission sui juris of Yixian 易縣
 April 11, 1946: Promoted as Metropolitan Archdiocese of Beijing.

Ordinaries 
 Metropolitan Archbishops of Beijing 北京
 Archbishop Joseph Li Shan, (李山), (September 21, 2007 – present)
 Archbishop Matthias Pei Shang-de, C.D.D. (June 29, 1989 - December 24, 2001)
 Cardinal Thomas Tien Ken-sin, S.V.D. (田耕莘) (April 11, 1946 – July 24, 1967)
 Apostolic Vicars of Beijing 北京 
 Bishop Paul Leon Cornelius Montaigne, C.M. (满德胎) (January 27, 1933 – April 1946)
 Bishop Stanislas Jarlin, C.M. (林懋德) (December 3, 1924 – January 27, 1933)
 Apostolic Vicars of Northern Chi-Li 直隸北境 
 Bishop Stanislas Jarlin, C.M. (林懋德) (April 5, 1905 – December 3, 1924)
 Bishop Pierre-Marie-Alphonse Favier, C.M. (樊國樑) (April 13, 1899 – April 4, 1905)
 Bishop Jean-Baptiste-Hippolyte Sarthou, C.M. (郁世良 / 都士良) (June 6, 1890 – April 13, 1899)
 Bishop François-Ferdinand Tagliabue, C.M. (戴世濟 / 戴濟世) (August 5, 1884 – March 13, 1890)
 Bishop Louis-Gabriel Delaplace, C.M. (田嘉璧 / 田類斯) (January 21, 1870 – May 24, 1884)
 Bishop Edmond-François Guierry, C.M. (蘇鳳文 / 蘇發旺) (December 4, 1868 – January 21, 1870)
 Bishop Joseph-Martial Mouly, C.M. (孟振生) (May 30, 1856 – December 4, 1868)
 Suffragan Bishops of Beijing 北京 (Latin Church) 
 Bishop Jean-Damascène Sallusti (1778-1781)
 Bishop Joseph-Martial Mouly, C.M. (孟振生) (January 3, 1856 – May 30, 1856)
 Bishop Joseph-Martial Mouly, C.M. (孟振生) (Apostolic Administrator April 28, 1846 – January 3, 1856)
 Bishop Cayetano Pires Pireira, C.M. (畢學源) (Apostolic Administrator August 1827 – November 2, 1838)
 Bishop Joaquim da Souza Saraiva, C.M. (July 6, 1808 – February 18, 1818)
 Bishop Alexandre de Gouvea (Gouveia), T.O.R. (16 Dec 1782 – 6 Jul 1808)
 Bishop Flaviano Giacomo Stefano Salustri, O.A.D. (20 Jul 1778 – 24 Sep 1781)
 Bishop Polycarpo de Sousa (Souza), S.J. (19 Dec 1740 – 26 May 1757)
 Bishop Francisco da Purificação da Rocha Froes, O.E.S.A. (21 Feb 1725 – 31 Jul 1731)
 Bishop Bernardino (Antonio) della Chiesa, O.F.M. Ref. (10 Apr 1690 – 21 Dec 1721)

 Archbishops of Khanbalik 汗八里  
 Archbishop Nicolas da Botras, O.S.F. (尼古拉) (1333 – 1338)
 Patriarch Giovanni da Montecorvino, O.F.M. (若望‧孟高维诺) (July 23, 1307 – 1328)
 Auxiliary bishop Andrew of Perugia (1307 – 1318), named Bishop of Citing
 Auxiliary bishop Andreuccio da Assisi, O.F.M. (1307 – died en route in India)
 Auxiliary bishop Gerardo Albuini (1307 – 1313), named Bishop of Citing
 Auxiliary bishop Nicolò da Banzia, O.F.M. (1307 – died en route in India)
 Auxiliary bishop Peregrino da Castello (1307 – 1320),  named Bishop of Citing
 Auxiliary bishop Ulrico da Seyfridsdorf, O.F.M. (1307 – died en route in India)
 Auxiliary bishop Guglielmo da Villanova (French: Guillaume de Villeneuve) (1307 – ?), named Bishop of Sagone in 1323)
 Auxiliary bishop Tomaso (1310 – ?), one of three bishops appointed to replace the three bishops who died in India
 Auxiliary bishop Pietro da Firenze (1310 – ?), one of three bishops appointed to replace the three bishops who died in India
 Auxiliary bishop Girolamo Catalano (1311 – ?), one of three bishops appointed to replace the three bishops who died in India

Province 
Its ecclesiastical province comprises the Metropolitan's own archdiocese and the following Suffragan dioceses:
 Anguo 安國
 Baoding 保定 
 Chengde 承德 
 Daming 大名
 Jingxian 景縣
 Shunde 順得
 Tianjin 天津
 Xianxian 獻縣
 Xuanhua 宣化
 Yongnian 永年
 Yongping 永平
 Zhaoxian 趙縣
 Zhengding 正定

See also 
 Cathedral of the Immaculate Conception in Beijing
 Christianity in China
 Catholicism in China
 List of Roman Catholic dioceses in China
 List of Roman Catholic dioceses (structured_view)-Episcopal Conference of China
 Michael Fu Tieshan

References

Sources and external links

 GCatholic.org
 Catholic Hierarchy

1307 establishments in Asia
1375 disestablishments
Organizations established in 1690
Beijing
Beijing
Religious organizations established in the 1690s
Beijing
Beijing
Organizations based in Beijing
14th-century establishments in China
Religion in Beijing